Robert Moffat MacQueen (born March 28, 1938 in Memphis, Tennessee) is an American physicist. He received his B.S. from Rhodes College in physics in 1960 where he was inducted into Omicron Delta Kappa, and his PhD from Johns Hopkins University in 1968 in atmospheric sciences. In 1967, he joined the National Center for Atmospheric Research (NCAR) as a staff scientist and attained senior scientist status in 1973. He was principal investigator for the White Light Coronagraph operated by the High Altitude Observatory (HAO) aboard the manned Skylab satellite from 1970 to 1977. In 1974, he received NASA's Exceptional Scientific Achievement Medal for his Skylab work as principal investigator of the white light coronagraph experiment that took nearly 36,000 photographs during the Apollo flight (it was one of six solar observing instruments).

Professional experience 

MacQueen was head of the Coronal Physics Section in HAO from 1977 to 1979, and was responsible for analyzing coronal photographs made during the Apollo 15, 16, and 17 lunar landing missions as principal investigator (1971–1973). He later served as principal investigator for several research projects, including HAO's Coronagraph/Polarimeter Experiment that was launched aboard NASA's Solar Maximum Mission spacecraft (1975–1979; 1984–1986), the Rocket Coronagraph Experiment (1975–1979), and the Coronagraph/X Ray/XUV experiment as part of the Solar Polar Mission (1978–1983). In a joint project with the Center for Astrophysics  Harvard & Smithsonian, he was one of the principal investigators for a series of solar observing rocket flights.

Director of HAO and NCAR 

From 1979 to 1986 MacQueen was director of HAO. He then became associate director of NCAR from 1986 to 1988, and acting director of NCAR from 1988 to 1989.  While at HAO and NCAR, Dr. MacQueen published several articles on coronal streamers and transients. Dr. MacQueen was also a lecturer (1969–1979) and an adjunct professor in the Department of Astrophysical, Planetary and Atmospheric Sciences at the University of Colorado. He left NCAR in 1990 after a one-year sabbatical to head the Physics Department at Rhodes College, where he taught until 2001.

Awards 

MacQueen received the NCAR Technology Advancement Award in 1973 and the NASA Medal for Exceptional Scientific Achievement in 1974.

References

External links 
Robert MacQueen Papers, 1947-1990. National Center for Atmospheric Research (NCAR) Archives.

1938 births
Johns Hopkins University alumni
Living people
People from Memphis, Tennessee
Rhodes College alumni
American physicists